Tailwind Air LLC is a commuter scheduled air carrier and charter airline based in Westchester Airport and Sikorsky Memorial Airport. Its main seaplane base is New York Skyports Seaplane Base (NYS) and it also owns its own Boston Harbor seaplane base (MA17), near Logan International Airport in Boston. The airline has a sister company named Tailwind Air, LLC, which charters and manages a fleet of land planes.

History
Tailwind operates scheduled and charter seaplane services out of the 23rd Street Seaplane base in Manhattan (NYS). Tailwind services Boston Logan Airport, Boston Harbor Seaplane Base, Shelter Island, Bridgeport, and the East Hampton Airport and Nantucket Airport with multiple shuttle flights. Initial competitors on these routes include Amtrak and Delta's and American Airlines' hourly shuttle services. Tailwind intends to move its routes to all water airports after regulatory approval. The routes are not serviced by any existing seaplane operator. In-flight service includes complimentary snacks and beverages.

Destinations
Tailwind operates flights to the following destinations:

Fleet
The Tailwind Air fleet consists of the following aircraft:

3 × Cessna 208EX Caravan
1 × Dassault Falcon 50
2 x Dassault Falcon 900EX
3 × SOCATA TBM-700
3 x SOCATA TBM-900
1 x Beechcraft King Air 250
1 x Cessna Citation CJ3
1 x Dassault Falcon 100
1 x Pilatus PC-12

Former fleet 
1 × Embraer Phenom 300

References

External links

Airlines established in 2014
Charter airlines of the United States
Aviation in New York City
Companies based in Manhattan
2014 establishments in New York City
American companies established in 2014
Seaplane operators
Airlines based in New York (state)